Idol: Jakten på en superstjerne 2011 was the sixth season of Idol Norway based on the British singing competition Pop Idol. After a four years break, in which the broadcast station aired to X Factor seasons, the show returned to Norwegian screens on August 30.

The panel of judges consisted of 1990s pop star Bertine Zetlitz, musical composer Hans Erik Dyvik Husby, pop star Marion Ravn and artist manager Gunnar Greve. Ravi, who was hosting the second season of X Factor shared hosting duties with Guri Solberg. The age limit again was 16-35 and auditions were held in Oslo (April 18), Trondheim (May 9), Stavanger (May 16) and Bergen.

On December 16, Jenny Langlo won over Vegard Leite and became the second female contestant to win the show after Jorun Stiansen took home victory in Season 3 six years ago.

Finals

Finalists
(ages stated at time of contest)

Elimination chart

References

External links
Profiles of the top 10 finalists

Season 06
2011 Norwegian television seasons